General Vaughan may refer to:

Alfred Jefferson Vaughan Jr. (1830–1899), Confederate States Army brigadier general
Harry H. Vaughan (1893–1981), U.S. Army Reserve major general
John Vaughan (British Army officer, died 1795) (c. 1731–1795), British Army lieutenant general
John Vaughan (British Army officer, born 1871) (1871–1956), British Army major general
Louis Vaughan (1875–1942), British Indian Army lieutenant general

See also
Clyde A. Vaughn (born 1946), U.S. Army  lieutenant general 
John C. Vaughn (1824–1875), Confederate States Army brigadier general
Attorney General Vaughan (disambiguation)